Sphingomonas jejuensis  is a Gram-negative, rod-shaped and non-motile bacteria from the genus of Sphingomonas which has been isolated from the sponge Hymeniacidon flavia near the Jeju Island in Korea.

References

Further reading

External links
Type strain of Sphingomonas jejuensis at BacDive -  the Bacterial Diversity Metadatabase

jejuensis
Bacteria described in 2012